Clémence Isaure  is a quasi-legendary French medieval figure credited with founding or restoring the Acadèmia dels Jòcs Florals or Academy of the Floral Games. She is supposed to have left a legacy to fund awards in the form of gold and silver flowers that the city of Toulouse would award annually to the best poets.

As the mythic founder of the games she is celebrated principally in Toulouse, where poems, sculptures, and paintings have been dedicated to her and a variety of places and institutions bear her name. In order to provide her with a realistic outline, she has been identified as a member of the Yzalguier family of Toulouse. In 1806 the rue des Yzalguier there was renamed the rue Clémence-Isaure. A tower at 7 de la rue Cujas was named the Tour Clémence Isaure. (It was demolished in 1817.)
 
For example, Charles Cros wrote in 1888:

Iconography 
 Clémence Isaure fountain
 Clémence Isaure appearing to the troubadors, hall of the notables, Capitole de Toulouse

References

Bibliography 

 
 
 

French culture
Romantic nationalism
People from Toulouse
French folklore
French poetry